The Maori River is a river of the West Coast Region of New Zealand's South Island. It flows from several sources in the Mataketake Range east of Haast, passing through the small Tawharekiri Lakes before becoming a tributary of the Waita River, which flows into the Tasman Sea 15 kilometres north of Haast.

See also
List of rivers of New Zealand

References

Rivers of the West Coast, New Zealand
Westland District
Rivers of New Zealand